This is a list of closed secondary schools in California.

There was a noticeable increase in closures starting about 1979, the year following the passage of Proposition 13. A change in funding changed the financial situation  for these school districts. Schools were  also closed for other reasons, including declining enrollments at the end of the Baby Boom, long term property ownership, population shift (older residents are less likely to produce new students), and white flight. Each of these local decisions were taken by individual school boards (or entities who operated private schools); many of those attributions are discussed in the linked articles.

School name discontinued
Certain events, such as closure, can result in the discontinuation of a school's name. In some cases, the same location has been reopened with a similar name.

Moved
This is a list of schools which have changed locations, resulting in closure or reuse of the old campus.

Closed and reopened

References

 
Closed Secondary Schools
Cal
High schools in California